Sixteen Mile Creek or Sixteenmile Creek may refer to:

Canada 
Ontario
Sixteen Mile Creek (Halton Region), which flows to the northwest shore of Lake Ontario
Sixteen Mile Creek (Muskoka District), a tributary of the Boyne River
Sixteen Mile Creek (Niagara Region), which flows to the southwest shore of Lake Ontario
Sixteenmile Creek (Ontario), in Elgin County, which flows into Lake Erie

United States 
 Sixteenmile Creek (Florida), a tributary of the St. Johns River
 Sixteen Mile Creek (Montana), a tributary of the Missouri River
 Sixteenmile Creek (Ohio), which flows into Lake Erie